Andrade Santos Silva (born 14 December 1981), known as just Anderson, is a Brazilian football player who plays for Arka Gdynia in the Ekstraklasa.

Club career
Anderson previously played for Juventude and Santa Cruz in the Campeonato Brasileiro Série A and Copa do Brasil.

References

External links

1981 births
Living people
Brazilian footballers
Brazilian expatriate footballers
Esporte Clube Juventude players
Associação Portuguesa de Desportos players
Lech Poznań players
Pogoń Szczecin players
Yokohama FC players
Santa Cruz Futebol Clube players
Arka Gdynia players
Expatriate footballers in Japan
Expatriate footballers in Poland
Campeonato Brasileiro Série A players
Ekstraklasa players
J1 League players
Brazilian expatriate sportspeople in Poland
Association football forwards